Rajesh Gopinathan (born 1971) was the outgoing CEO and Managing Director of Tata Consultancy Services (TCS), an Indian IT services and consulting organization and one of the country's largest employers. He was elevated to the role of Chief Executive in February 2017 after serving as the Chief Financial Officer since 2013.  Rajesh is one of the youngest CEOs in the Tata Group.

Early and personal life
Gopinathan was born in Thrissur, Kerala. He grew up in Lucknow and did his schooling from St. Mary’s Convent Inter College RDSO Manak Nagar Lucknow. He is also the Alumni of 1987 Batch of SMCIC RDSO LKO as per his batchmates. Presently he resides in Mumbai with his wife, daughter, and son. Rajesh likes to go for long walks, he loves reading books, travelling and watching movies.

Education
Rajesh did his schooling from St. Mary’s Convent Inter College RDSO Manak Nagar Lucknow, is Alumni of 1987 Batch of SMCIC RDSO LKO as per his batchmates. Rajesh graduated in 1994 with an Electrical and Electronics Engineering degree from the Regional Engineering College, Tiruchirappalli (now National Institute of Technology, Tiruchirappalli). In 1996, he obtained a post-graduate diploma in Management (PGDM, equivalent to an MBA) from Indian Institute of Management Ahmedabad.

Career

Tata Strategic Management Group

He joined the Tata Strategic Management Group in 1996, where he worked on multiple assignments with Tata companies.

Tata Consultancy Services

In 2001, Rajesh joined Tata Consultancy Services from the Tata Industries and worked to drive TCS’ newly established e-business unit in the United States. He was involved in the design, structure and implementation of the new organizational structure and operating model of the company. Rajesh took over as the Chief Financial Officer of the company in 2013. Prior to this role, he was Vice President – Business Finance, where he was responsible for the financial management of the company's individual operating units. After serving as the Chief Financial Officer of the company for 4 years, he was elevated to the role of Chief Executive Officer in February 2017.

Rajesh has played a key role in helping TCS become a 22 billion global company at the end of fiscal year 2020. With over 469,000 associates, TCS is one of the largest private sector employers globally and was recognized as a Global Top Employer for the sixth consecutive year in 2021, with the highest retention rate in a competitive industry.

Under Rajesh’s leadership, the market capitalization of the company crossed USD 100 billion during April 2018, making TCS the most valuable company in India. In 2021, TCS’ brand value grew by $1.4 billion over the prior year to USD 15 billion and was ranked among the Top 3 most valuable brands in the IT Services sector globally according to the Brand Finance 2021 report.

Resignation from TCS

He will resign as chief executive officer, effective Sept. 15 2023  He is set to be replaced by K.Krithivasan, the company's President and global head of banking, financial services and insurance (BFSI) vertical, who has been named CEO-designate effective March 16, 2023.

Awards and recognition 

2021 - India’s Best CEO in the category of Super large companies by Business Today (India)
2020 - Outstanding Business Leader of the Year - CNBC TV18 India Business Leader Awards’ (IBLA)
2019 - Management Man of the Year - 40th Bombay Management Association Corporate Leadership and Academic Awards
2019 - CEO Force for Good Award - Globe by CECP
2018 - Best CEO (First Place) - Institutional Investor's 2018 All Asia Executive Team Rankings
2014 - Young Alumni Achiever's Award - Corporate Leader Category Indian Institute of Management Ahmedabad

References 

Businesspeople from Thrissur
Living people
1971 births
National Institute of Technology, Tiruchirappalli alumni
Indian Institute of Management Ahmedabad alumni
Tata Consultancy Services people